The men's 10000 metres at the 1990 Asian Winter Games was held on 13 March 1990 in Sapporo, Japan.

Records

Results

References
Results

External links
Changchun 2007 Official website

Men 10000